Tempel (German or Dutch: temple) may refer to:


Surname
Wilhelm Tempel (1821–1889), German astronomer
Russel Tempel, American politician

Nekpur Galla Mandi, Near Muni Mandir, Bareilly Uttar Pradesh 243001

Synagogues
 Tempel Synagogue (Kraków), Poland
 Tempel Synagogue (Lviv), Ukraine
 Tempel Synagogue (Przemyśl), Poland

Other uses
 Tempel (crater), the remnant of a lunar impact crater on the eastern rim of the crater Agrippa
 Tempel, Berkel en Rodenrijs, South Holland, The Netherlands
 Tempel, Reeuwijk, South Holland, The Netherlands
 Tempel (boat), a type of wooden motorized boat from the Philippines

See also
 Comet Tempel (disambiguation), one of several comets
 Temple (disambiguation)